Rihaakuru (ރިހާކުރު, pronounced ) is a fish-based thick sauce. The color varies from light brown to dark brown. It is a traditional dish of Maldivian cuisine, consumed almost daily in every household in Maldives and in Minicoy since ancient times. Rihaakuru is produced as a by-product of the processing of tuna.

History
Maldivian travellers introduced Rihaakuru and Bondi to Sri Lanka (then Ceylon).  Sri Lankans considered these as delicacies and referred to them as Bondi Haluwa and Diya Hakuru (rhyming derivative, of the original Dhivehi term, which means 'liquid jaggery' in the Sinhalese language) respectively.  These terms were popular in Sri Lankan households until the latter part of the 20th century, when they gradually disappeared.

Preparation
Rihaakuru is obtained through following a simple but time-consuming procedure. The extract is the result of hours of cooking of tuna in water and salt, while carefully removing the scum (filleyo) that keeps forming. Once the tuna pieces are cooked and ready to eat or store, they will be removed from the water, as well as the bones, heads and fish guts. The pieces of Tuna, so cooked, get eventually processed into Maldive fish.  The remaining "fish-soup" (Garudhiya) is left with Bondi (balls of tuna scraps scraped off the bones), and is kept boiling in low fire until most water evaporates. The resulting concentrated fish soup becomes a thick paste which is known in Dhivehi as Rihaakuru.

Rihaakuru is eaten pure in the Maldives along with rice, taro, roti or breadfruit. It is also cooked with fried onions, curry-leaves (hikandifaiy) and chilies in order to obtain a delicious variant called theluli rihaakuru (spiced rihaakuru). In Maldivian cuisine it is also mixed with coconut milk, to obtain a dish called rihaakuru diya.

In some countries people use Rihaakuru as a sandwich spread, likening its use to other by-product spreads such as Vegemite, Bovril and Marmite . A noticeable consumption of Rihaakuru has been recorded in China, namely in Chinese dishes like Cha Kuay Teow Mee, Fried Vegetables (Kai Lan, Chye Sim and Pak choy) and Hue Muay.

Rihaakuru is slightly acidic (pH 5.6-6.2) and is rich in polyunsaturated fatty acids such as omega-3 and protein. The histamine concentration of Rihaakuru has been described as being  at levels that are regarded as a risk to human health, however Maldivians are mostly immune to any poisoning that may result from this.

See also
 List of tuna dishes

References

External links
 MIFCO Rihaakuru

Maldivian cuisine
Tuna dishes
Ancient dishes